Melanie Matthews (born 6 August 1986) is a Canadian softball player. She competed in the women's tournament at the 2008 Summer Olympics. At the collegiate level she played for Simon Fraser and Stetson.

References

External links
 

1986 births
Living people
Canadian softball players
Olympic softball players of Canada
Softball players at the 2008 Summer Olympics
Sportspeople from Vancouver
Simon Fraser Red Leafs
Stetson Hatters